John Hamilton Hinde AM (26 October 1911 – 4 July 2006) was an Australian broadcaster and film reviewer. He worked for the Australian Broadcasting Corporation (ABC) for more than fifty years, in both television and radio.

Hinde was also one of Australia's first foreign correspondents, reporting from the Pacific Theater during World War II.

Upon his death he bequeathed A$1 million to start a literary prize in honour of his late wife. He also left $500,000 to establish the John Hinde Award, for a science fiction script for film or television.

Biography

Early years

Born in 1911, Hinde grew up in Adelaide. He started studying medicine at the University of Adelaide, but dropped out and married. After a short lived marriage he went first to Melbourne and later to Sydney.

In Sydney, Hinde got a job with The Daily Telegraph in 1937, but was sacked by the editor, Syd Deamer, who mistook him for someone else. Hinde then took a job with the Labor Daily, but soon left because of a political disagreement. Deamer later became editor of ABC Weekly and rehired him. Hinde then joined the ABC News and Current Affairs department in 1939 and in the same year married for the second time to Barbara Jefferis (who later became a well-known novelist).

War correspondent

In 1942 Hinde got a break as a war correspondent, after senior correspondent, Haydon Lennard, was badly injured in a plane crash in New Guinea. Hinde was attached to General Douglas MacArthur's headquarters in 1942, first in Melbourne and then Brisbane, and eventually got to New Guinea and the Pacific.

Hinde was hurt whilst at Hollandia in Netherlands New Guinea, after a Japanese Betty bomber bombed a US Army ammunition dump. His eyes were badly injured, which affected him for the rest of his life.

After the war Hinde returned to Sydney and was responsible for writing the ABC's first television news bulletin. But in 1963, with no career progress, a frustrated Hinde resigned from the ABC and for three years, with his wife earning a good living from her novels, Hinde indulged in electronics, his favourite pastime.

Film reviewer

After the ABC's previous reviewer, Frank Legg, was killed in a car crash, Hinde was offered freelance work as the film critic. To start with he received £30 and tickets to three movies a week which he then critiqued on a radio show: initially on 2BL, but later on Radio 2 and ABC regional radio.

Hinde made the transition from radio to television, in 1983, and found the switch surprisingly easy. Hinde found though that on television he could not be as critical as on radio, but the value of showing footage made up for that. By 1986 he was doing film reviews every Sunday night as part of the ABC television news.

Cult following

Towards the end of his career, Hinde gained a new generation of fans through appearances on comedy programs like Elle McFeast's ABC show McFeast. He was renowned for outrageous skits on the show, even donning high heels and pink tights for McFeast's foray into the Sydney Gay and Lesbian Mardi Gras. He was astonished that he had gained a cult following, saying "When I went to Adelaide recently, young people were stopping me in the street everywhere".

In 1999, with his eyesight failing and threatened by blindness, he was obliged to retire because he could not watch films properly.  The last film that John Hinde presented on the ABC was Odd Man Out, starring James Mason and Kathleen Ryan, on 15 December 1999.

In 2002, Hinde was appointed a Member of the Order of Australia in the Queen's Birthday Honours list for his services to the film and media industry.

He died on 4 July 2006 in a suburban nursing home in Sydney.

Barbara Jefferis Award

Upon Hinde's death the Barbara Jefferis Award was created in 2007 in honour of Hinde's late wife of 64 years, Barbara Jefferis. The literary prize will be one of Australia's richest, the result of a $1 million bequest by Hinde.

The Australian Society of Authors (ASA) will administer the Award, which will go to the author of "the best Australian novel that empowers the status of females or depicts them in a positive light." The annual prize will be at least $35,000 but is likely to be around $42,000 to match the Miles Franklin Award.

See also
Bill Collins
Ivan Hutchinson
Margaret Pomeranz
David Stratton

References

External links
ABC Around the World – World War II – The Pacific
The Age News article upon his death

1911 births
2006 deaths
Australian radio personalities
Australian television presenters
Australian film critics
Members of the Order of Australia